Boeol may refer to:
Buol (city), Indonesia 
Buol (village), Indonesia